Kiyoshi K. Muranaga (February 16, 1922 – June 26, 1944) was a United States Army soldier and a recipient of the United States military's highest decoration—the Medal of Honor—for his actions in World War II.

Early life 
Muranaga was born in California to Japanese immigrant parents. He is a Nisei, which means that he is a second generation Japanese-American. He was raised as one of the oldest of 9 other siblings in what is now Gardena, California.

He was interned with his family at the Granada War Relocation Center in Colorado following the signing of Executive Order 9066.

Soldier
Muranaga joined the US Army in May 1943.

Muranaga volunteered to be part of the all-Nisei 442nd Regimental Combat Team.  This army unit was mostly made up of Japanese Americans from Hawaii and the mainland.
  Muranaga was killed on the first day of action for the 442nd in Italy.

For his actions in June 1944, he was posthumously awarded the Army's second-highest decoration, the Distinguished Service Cross.  A 1990s review of service records for Asian Americans who received the Distinguished Service Cross during World War II led to Muranaga's award being upgraded to the Medal of Honor. In a ceremony at the White House on June 21, 2000, his surviving family was presented with his Medal of Honor by President Bill Clinton. Twenty-one other Asian Americans also received the medal during the ceremony, all but seven of them posthumously.

Muranaga, aged 22 at his death, was buried in Evergreen Cemetery, Los Angeles, California.

Muranaga's brothers were also soldiers. Kenichi (1924–2009) and Yoshio (1923–2008) also were in the 442nd.  The youngest brother Tomi (born 1935) was a soldier in Korea.

Medal of Honor citation
Muranaga's Medal of Honor recognized his conduct in frontline fighting in central Italy in 1944.

On June 26, 1944, Muranaga was serving as a private first class in the 442nd Regimental Combat Team. On that day, near Suvereto, Italy, he single-handedly manned his squad's mortar weapon in an attempt to destroy an enemy artillery gun. Muranaga was able to fire three shells before being killed by the enemy's return fire.

Private First Class Muranaga's official Medal of Honor citation reads:

See also
List of Asian American Medal of Honor recipients
List of Medal of Honor recipients for World War II

References

External links
 "Army Secretary Lionizes 22 World War II Heroes" at Defense.gov
 

1922 births
1944 deaths
United States Army personnel killed in World War II
United States Army Medal of Honor recipients
People from Los Angeles
United States Army soldiers
Japanese-American internees
American military personnel of Japanese descent
Recipients of the Distinguished Service Cross (United States)
Burials at Evergreen Cemetery, Los Angeles
World War II recipients of the Medal of Honor